Radim Skuhrovec (born May 10, 1974) was a Czech professional ice hockey defenceman. He played with HC Litvínov in the Czech Extraliga during the 2010–11 Czech Extraliga season. He wear number 44

Career statistics

References

External links

1974 births
Czech ice hockey defencemen
HC Litvínov players
HC Olomouc players
HC Slovan Ústečtí Lvi players
Living people
Piráti Chomutov players
Rytíři Kladno players
Sportovní Klub Kadaň players